Proletarsk is a town and the administrative center of Proletarsky District in Rostov Oblast, Russia, located on the Manych River, on the Rostov-on-Don–Baku railway. Population:

History
It was formerly the Cossack stanitsa of Velikoknyazheskaya.

Administrative and municipal status
Within the framework of administrative divisions, Proletarsk serves as the administrative center of Proletarsky District. As an administrative division, it is, together with three rural localities, incorporated within Proletarsky District as Proletarskoye Urban Settlement. As a municipal division, this administrative unit also has urban settlement status and is a part of Proletarsky Municipal District.

Notable people
Soviet science fiction writer Petrony Gay Amatuni was born there in 1916.

References

Notes

Sources

Cities and towns in Rostov Oblast
Don Host Oblast